In Riemannian geometry, a branch of mathematics, the prescribed Ricci curvature problem is as follows: given a smooth manifold M and a symmetric 2-tensor h, construct a metric on M whose Ricci curvature tensor equals h.

See also 
 Prescribed scalar curvature problem

References
Thierry Aubin, Some nonlinear problems in Riemannian geometry.  Springer Monographs in Mathematics, 1998.
Arthur L. Besse. Einstein manifolds. Reprint of the 1987 edition. Classics in Mathematics. Springer-Verlag, Berlin, 2008. xii+516 pp. 
Dennis M. DeTurck, Existence of metrics with prescribed Ricci curvature: local theory.  Invent. Math.  65  (1981/82), no. 1, 179–207.

Riemannian geometry
Mathematical problems
ricci curvature